Dalian Discovery Kingdom, also translated as Dalian Discoveryland or Kingdom of Discovery, is an amusement park located at Jinshitan National Holiday Resort in Jinzhou District, Dalian, Liaoning, China. Opened in 2006, it is currently the largest amusement park in Liaoning.

Attractions
The Discoveryland is divided into six themed areas: Crazy Town, Mysterious Desert, Metal Factory, Magic Forest, Legend Castle and Wedding Palace. As of 2014, the theme park features three sets of roller coasters, two water rides, a vertical drop tower and other attractions which make up approximately twenty rides in total. The most notable feature of the park is a giant stony-looking fortress built within a small lake in the centre. During the theme parks' opening season a parade roams through the internal paths at noon everyday, entertaining the visitors. At night fireworks are set off for the leaving visitors seeing their final exhibition. The theme park is closed during winter season.

Gallery

References

External links
  Official Website
 Roller Coaster Database on park
 Additional Information on schedules, ticket prices, address, contact information and gallery.

Dalian
Amusement parks in China
Buildings and structures in Liaoning
Tourist attractions in Liaoning
2006 establishments in China